The Ruchen is a mountain of the Jura, located on the border between the Swiss cantons of Basel-Landschaft and Solothurn. It lies between Langenbruck and Eptingen. The Ruchen is the easternmost summit above 1,100 metres in the Jura Mountains. East of the Ruchen is the Belchenflue.

References

External links
Ruchen on Hikr

Mountains of Switzerland
Mountains of Basel-Landschaft
Mountains of the Jura
Mountains of the canton of Solothurn
One-thousanders of Switzerland
Basel-Landschaft–Solothurn border